The International Journal of Psychology is a bimonthly peer-reviewed academic journal covering all aspects of psychology. It was established in 1966 by Paul Fraisse, and is published by Wiley-Blackwell on behalf of the International Union of Psychological Science. The editor-in-chief is Abigail H. Gewirtz (University of Minnesota).

Abstracting and indexing
The journal is abstracted and indexed by:

According to the Journal Citation Reports, the journal has a 2014 impact factor of 1.198.

References

External links

Publications established in 1966
Psychology journals
Wiley-Blackwell academic journals
Bimonthly journals
English-language journals